Münzkirchen (Bavarian: Münzkira) is a municipality in the district of Schärding in Upper Austria, Austria.

Geography
Münzkirchen is divided into six cadastral subdivisions, namely Eisenbirn, Freundorf, Hofalt, Landertsberg, Münzkirchen and Schießdorf.

The 14 localities that belong to the municipality are Eisenbirn, Eitzenberg, Feicht, Ficht, Freundorf, Füxledt, Geibing, Hötzenberg, Landertsberg, Ludham, Prackenberg, Raad, Schießdorf and Wilhelming.

Maria Mandl
Münzkirchen was the birthplace of Nazi SS concentration camp guard Maria Mandl, who was executed in 1948 for war crimes.

References

Sauwald
Cities and towns in Schärding District